SCM Anywhere is SQL Server-based software configuration management tool with integrated revision control, bug tracking and build automation. It supports integration with CruiseControl.NET and ANT. Developed by Dynamsoft.

SCM Anywhere is a client/server system. The server manages a central database and a master repository of file versions. Users work on files in a local client working folder and submit changed files together in changesets. On-premises software and Software as a service editions available.

Integration with Visual SourceSafe compatible IDEs is supported as well as Cross-platform.

See also
 Configuration management
 Software configuration management
 Dynamsoft Sourceanywhere

References

External links
Product Overview
Standalone Edition Overview
Hosted Edition Overview

Proprietary version control systems